Nimrod Levi (born March 24, 1995) is an Israeli-Swedish professional basketball player for Hapoel Galil Elyon of the Israeli Basketball Premier League. Levi was named the Israeli Basketball Premier League Most Improved Player in 2018.

Early life
Levi was born in Ramat Gan, Israel. He grew up in Modiin and started playing basketball when he was 9 years old. Levi played for Otzma Modiin and Maccabi Tel Aviv youth teams. He joined Wingate Institute Youth Academy in his late teens.

Professional career

Early years (2013–2017)
In 2013, Levi started his professional career with Hapoel Kfar Saba of the Liga Leumit. Later that season, he joined Maccabi Be'er Yaakov. In 2014, Levi joined Ironi Ramat Gan as part of Maccabi Tel Aviv's youth project, alongside Dragan Bender and Ben Altit.

On August 5, 2015, Levi signed with Hapoel Galil Elyon for the 2015–16 season. In 26 games played for Galil Elyon, Levi averaged 13.9 points, 8 rebounds and 2 assists per game.

On August 13, 2016, Levi signed a three-year deal with Maccabi Rishon LeZion.
However, In March 2017, Levi parted ways with Rishon LeZion to join Maccabi Tel Aviv for the remainder of the season.

Maccabi Ashdod (2017–2018)
On August 6, 2017, Levi signed with Maccabi Ashdod for the 2017–18 season. On January 4, 2018, Levi recorded a season-high 20 points, along with 8 rebounds and 3 steals in a 95–87 win over Bnei Herzliya. On February 1, 2018, Levi was named Israeli Player of the Month for games played in January.

Levi led Ashdod to the 2018 Israeli League Playoffs, where they eventually were eliminated by Hapoel Tel Aviv. In 37 games played for Ashdod, he averaged 10.3 points, 6.3 rebounds and 1.4 assists per game. On June 8, 2018, Levi was named the Israeli Basketball Premier League Most Improved Player.

Return to Maccabi (2018–2019)
On July 16, 2018, Levi returned to Maccabi Tel Aviv for a second stint, signing a two-year deal. However, on January 15, 2019, Levi parted ways with Maccabi.

Return to Ashdod (2019)
On March 1, 2019, Levi returned to Maccabi Ashdod for a second stint, signing for the rest of the season. On May 20, 2019, Levi recorded a career-high 36 points, shooting 15-of-22 from the field, along with seven rebounds and three assists in a 100–89 win over Hapoel Holon. He was subsequently named Israeli League Round 33 MVP.

Hapoel Jerusalem (2019–2020)
On July 17, 2019, Levi signed a two-year deal with Hapoel Jerusalem.

Ironi Nes Ziona (2020–2021)
On August 12, 2020, Levi signed with Ironi Nes Ziona of the Israeli Premier League.

Hapoel Galil Elyon (2021–present)
On August 5, 2021, he signed with Hapoel Galil Elyon of the Israeli Premier League.

National team career
Levi is a member of the Israeli national basketball team. On February 23, 2018, He made his first appearance for the senior team at the 2019 FIBA Basketball World Cup qualification match against Great Britain.

Levi was also a member of the Israeli Under-18 and Under-20 national teams.

Career statistics

EuroLeague

|-
| style="text-align:left;"| 2016–17
| style="text-align:left;" rowspan=2| Maccabi
| 5 || 0 || 4.3 || .666 || .750 || .0 || .6 || .0 || .0 || .0 || 2.2 || 1.4
|-
| style="text-align:left;"| 2018–19
| 5 || 0 || 2.3 || .500 || 1.000 || .0 || .2 || .0 || .0 || .0 || .6 || .4
|- class="sortbottom"
| style="text-align:center;" colspan=2| Career
| 10 || 0 || 4.3 || .625|| .800 || .0 || .4 || .0 || .0 || 0 || 1.4 || .9

References

External links
 RealGM profile
 FIBA.com Profile
 EuroLeague profile

1995 births
Living people
Hapoel Galil Elyon players
Hapoel Jerusalem B.C. players
Hapoel Kfar Saba B.C. players
Ironi Nes Ziona B.C. players
Ironi Ramat Gan players
Israeli men's basketball players
Maccabi Ashdod B.C. players
Maccabi Rishon LeZion basketball players
Maccabi Tel Aviv B.C. players
Power forwards (basketball)
People from Ramat Gan
Swedish men's basketball players